Stockbridge Falls is a waterfall located on Oneida Creek southwest of Munnsville, New York.

References

Waterfalls of New York (state)
Landforms of Madison County, New York
Tourist attractions in Madison County, New York